Whinnimic Falls is a waterfall in the headwaters of Lemah Creek in the Alpine Lakes Wilderness Area. It is set in a narrow valley below Lemah Mountain. The falls are one of two in the valley, the other being the smaller Upper Lemah Valley Falls. The stream heads in two tarns and the remains of a small glacier.

The name "Whinnimic Falls" was mentioned in the red Cascade Alpine Guide by Fred Beckey. The origin of the name is unknown.

References

External links
World Waterfall Database entry on Whinnimic Falls
Picture of Upper Lemah Creek Falls

Landforms of Kittitas County, Washington
Waterfalls of Washington (state)
Plunge waterfalls